Cauchois is one of the eastern dialects of the Norman language that is spoken in and takes its name from the Pays de Caux region of the Seine-Maritime départment.

Status
The Pays de Caux is one of the remaining strongholds of the Norman language outside the Cotentin. Statistics give a wide range of interpretations as to numbers of speakers: between 0.3% and 19.1% of residents of Seine-Maritime identify themselves as speakers of Cauchois.

Phonology
These are some distinguishing features of Cauchois from other Norman dialects:
the absence of /h/
the loss of /r/ between vowels

Literature

The Purin literature of the 17th and 18th centuries, published in Rouen, is the earliest Norman literature displaying Cauchois features. However, the Norman literary revival, which started in the Channel Islands and Cotentin in the 19th century, was not reflected in the Pays de Caux until the early 20th century. From 1910 onwards, a range of literature was produced; one of the features of Norman literature characteristic of Cauchois literature was the mixture of French and Norman. In Lower Normandy, Norman literature since the revival period has tended to be as exclusively Norman as possible. In the Pays de Caux, by contrast, alongside literature written exclusively in Cauchois, a genre of literature developed in which narrative is written in French and dialogue in Cauchois, or dialogue is written in French or Cauchois, according to the language of the character.

Notable writers in Cauchois include Gabriel Benoist (author of the  stories), Ernest Morel, Gaston Demongé, Maurice Le Sieutre and Marceau Rieul. Jehan Le Povremoyne (pseudonym of Ernest Coquin) wrote stories of the mixed dialogue genre, as did Raymond Mensire.

See also
List of Norman language writers

References

Norman language
Seine-Maritime
Languages attested from the 17th century